Anders Burström (born January 28, 1976) is a Swedish former professional ice hockey player who most notably played for Luleå HF in the Swedish Hockey League. He spent ten seasons with his hometown team between 1993 and 2003.  He spent one season in the SM-liiga in Finland for HPK and Jokerit before returning to Sweden, playing for Södertälje SK. In 2006, Burström returned to Luleå.

External links

1976 births
HPK players
Jokerit players
Living people
Luleå HF players
Södertälje SK players
Swedish ice hockey right wingers
People from Luleå
Sportspeople from Norrbotten County